F1 ROC: Race of Champions, released in Japan and Europe as , is a 1992 racing video game developed by Seta Corporation for the Super Nintendo Entertainment System.

The following year, the game was followed up with F1 ROC II: Race of Champions.

Gameplay

There are sixteen open wheel racing tracks in the game; all of them correspond to the 1992 Formula One season, with races all over the Earth. Realistic looking advertisements are present where the audience sits, complete with near-perfect spelling of sponsors; this mild level of censorship applies because some of the sponsors are tobacco or alcohol-related. The game uses the Super Famicom's Mode 7 to give the track and background perspective.

Players have a limited amount of money to modify their race car before having to qualify and eventually try to win the race. Modifications must be purchased out of the player's pocket as if they were a driver/owner. As with F1 rules at the time, no refueling is possible; pit stops are only used to fix damage on the automobile. Post-race damage penalties will occur if the player finished the race with a damaged vehicle. Even a minor dent can be expensive to a rookie because of the high level of precision by the mechanics. Total damage can and will force the player to retire from the race. The player can choose to hide stats such as position in the race (in order to have an unobstructed view of the backgrounds).

Reception

In an import review for Mean Machines, Julian Rignall cited Exhaust Heat as "one of the most rewarding, enjoyable and long-lasting racing games around", although he noted that "there no trackside obstacles and the game has a rather sparse and empty feel about it." Radion Automatic also praised the game, writing that "ven non-race fans will be converted by this stunning release." Writers for Famitsu called Exhaust Heat an "easy type of F-Zero".

See also
F1 Pole Position (video game)

References

External links

1992 video games
Formula One video games
SETA Corporation games
Super Nintendo Entertainment System games
Super Nintendo Entertainment System-only games
Video games developed in Japan
Video games set in 1992